Doba  is a village in the administrative district of Gmina Giżycko, within Giżycko County, Warmian-Masurian Voivodeship, in northern Poland. It is located on the western shore of Dobskie Lake in the region of Masuria.

The village has a population of 210.

References

Populated lakeshore places in Poland
Doba